Howard Charles Cannon III (September 23, 1955 – March 29, 2016), known as Twilly Cannon, was an American environmental and social justice activist.

Cannon was born in Newark, New Jersey to Barbara and Howard Cannon Jr. and grew up in Point Pleasant Beach, New Jersey. He attended Christian Brothers Academy in Lincroft and The Evergreen State College. In 1995, he and Mike Roselle founded the Ruckus Society, a nonprofit organization that sponsors skill-sharing and non-violent direct action training, strategy and consultation for activists and organizers from frontline and impacted communities working on social justice, human rights, migrant rights, workers rights and environmental justice.

He died in Brielle, New Jersey, aged 60.

References 

1955 births
2016 deaths
Christian Brothers Academy (New Jersey) alumni
People from Newark, New Jersey
American environmentalists
American non-fiction environmental writers